Doin' It or Doing It may refer to:

Books
Doing It (novel), 2004 novel by Melvin Burgess
Doing It: Let's Talk About Sex, 2017 book by Hannah Witton

Music
Doin' It, 1969 album by Spanky Wilson
Doin' It, 2001 album by Papa Grows Funk
"Doin' It" (LL Cool J song), 1996
"Doin' It" (Liberty X song), 2001
"Doing It" (Charli XCX song), 2014
"Doin' It" (Big Boi song), 2019
"Doin' It", song by Herbie Hancock on the album Secrets

See also 
 Do It (disambiguation)